Anna Olofsson (born 17 September 1981) is a Swedish snowboarder. She was born in Östersund. She competed at the 2006 Winter Olympics, in halfpipe.

References

External links 
 

1981 births
Living people
People from Östersund
Swedish female snowboarders
Olympic snowboarders of Sweden
Snowboarders at the 2006 Winter Olympics
Sportspeople from Jämtland County
21st-century Swedish women